Dacom or DACOM may refer to:  

 Dacom, Inc.,  Fax and data company
Deutsche-Afghanische Companie, German  trading company
 LG Dacom,  South Korean cellular carrier